This is a list of French television related events from 1976.

Events
29 March - Catherine Ferry is selected to represent France at the 1976 Eurovision Song Contest with her song "Un, deux, trois". She is selected to be the twentieth French Eurovision entry during a national final.

Debuts
6 January - 30 millions d'amis (1976-2016)
22 March - Les Jeux de 20 Heures (1976-1987)

Television shows

1940s
Le Jour du Seigneur (1949–present)

1950s
La Piste aux étoiles (1956-1978)

1960s
La Tête et les Jambes (1960-1978)
Les Coulisses de l'exploit (1961-1972)
Les Dossiers de l'écran (1967-1991)
Monsieur Cinéma (1967-1980)
Les Animaux du monde (1969-1990)
Alain Decaux raconte (1969-1987)
Télé-Philatélie

1970s
Aujourd'hui Madame (1970-1982)

Ending this year
La Une est à vous (1973-1976, 1987-1994)

Births
23 March - Elisa Tovati, singer, actress & TV personality
5 October - Alessandra Sublet, TV & radio presenter

Deaths

See also
1976 in France
List of French films of 1976